A category mistake, or category error, or categorical mistake, or mistake of category, is a semantic or ontological error in which things belonging to a particular category are presented as if they belong to a different category, or, alternatively, a property is ascribed to a thing that could not possibly have that property. An example is a person learning that the game of cricket involves team spirit, and after being given a demonstration of each player's role, asking which player performs the "team spirit".  Unlike bowling or batting, team spirit is not a task in the game but an aspect of how the team behaves as a group.

To show that a category mistake has been committed one must typically show that once the phenomenon in question is properly understood, it becomes clear that the claim being made about it could not possibly be true.

Gilbert Ryle
The term "category-mistake" was introduced by Gilbert Ryle in his book The Concept of Mind (1949) to remove what he argued to be a confusion over the nature of mind born from Cartesian metaphysics. Ryle argued that it was a mistake to treat the mind as an object made of an immaterial substance because predications of substance are not meaningful for a collection of dispositions and capacities.

The phrase is introduced in the first chapter. The first example is of a visitor to Oxford. The visitor, upon viewing the colleges and library, reportedly inquired "But where is the University?" The visitor's mistake is presuming that a University is part of the category "units of physical infrastructure" rather than that of an "institution". Ryle's second example is of a child witnessing the march-past of a division of soldiers.  After having had battalions, batteries, squadrons, etc. pointed out, the child asks when is the division going to appear. "The march-past was not a parade of battalions, batteries, squadrons and a division; it was a parade of the battalions, batteries and squadrons of a division." (Ryle's italics) His third example is of a foreigner being shown a cricket match.  After being pointed out batsmen, bowlers and fielders, the foreigner asks: "who is left to contribute the famous element of team-spirit?" He goes on to argue that the Cartesian dualism of mind and body rests on a category mistake.

See also
Catachresis
Colorless green ideas sleep furiously
Oxymoron
Mixed metaphor
Not even wrong
Apples and oranges

References

Informal fallacies
Philosophy of language
Arguments in philosophy of mind
Error